Haplophyllum is a genus of flowering plants belonging to the family Rutaceae. It is the only genus in the subfamily Haplophylloideae.

Its native range is Mediterranean regions to Southern Siberia and Somalia.

Species:

Haplophyllum acutifolium 
Haplophyllum alberti-regelii 
Haplophyllum amoenum 
Haplophyllum arbuscula 
Haplophyllum armenum 
Haplophyllum bakhteganicum 
Haplophyllum balcanicum 
Haplophyllum bastetanum 
Haplophyllum blanchei 
Haplophyllum boissierianum 
Haplophyllum broussonetianum 
Haplophyllum bucharicum 
Haplophyllum buhsei 
Haplophyllum bungei 
Haplophyllum buxbaumii 
Haplophyllum canaliculatum 
Haplophyllum cappadocicum 
Haplophyllum ciscaucasicum 
Haplophyllum cordatum 
Haplophyllum coronatum 
Haplophyllum crenulatum 
Haplophyllum dasygynum 
Haplophyllum dauricum 
Haplophyllum dshungaricum 
Haplophyllum dubium 
Haplophyllum ermenekense 
Haplophyllum erythraeum 
Haplophyllum eugenii-korovinii 
Haplophyllum ferganicum 
Haplophyllum fruticulosum 
Haplophyllum furfuraceum 
Haplophyllum gilesii 
Haplophyllum glaberrimum 
Haplophyllum griffithianum 
Haplophyllum kowalenskyi 
Haplophyllum laeviusculum 
Haplophyllum laristanicum 
Haplophyllum latifolium 
Haplophyllum linifolium 
Haplophyllum lissonotum 
Haplophyllum luteoversicolor 
Haplophyllum megalanthum 
Haplophyllum molle 
Haplophyllum monadelphum 
Haplophyllum multicaule 
Haplophyllum myrtifolium 
Haplophyllum obtusifolium 
Haplophyllum patavinum 
Haplophyllum pedicellatum 
Haplophyllum poorei 
Haplophyllum ptilostylum 
Haplophyllum pumiliforme 
Haplophyllum ramosissimum 
Haplophyllum rechingeri 
Haplophyllum robustum 
Haplophyllum rubrotinctum 
Haplophyllum sahinii 
Haplophyllum sanguineum 
Haplophyllum shelkovnikovii 
Haplophyllum stapfanum 
Haplophyllum suaveolens 
Haplophyllum telephioides 
Haplophyllum tenue 
Haplophyllum thesioides 
Haplophyllum tragacanthoides 
Haplophyllum tuberculatum 
Haplophyllum versicolor 
Haplophyllum villosum 
Haplophyllum vulcanicum 
Haplophyllum vvedenskyi

References

 
Rutaceae genera